Jøa is an island in the municipality of Namsos in Trøndelag county, Norway. The  island lies on the south side of the Foldafjord, between the mainland and the islands of Otterøya and Elvalandet. The island is partially forested, with the southern part being flat and marshy, and the northern part being more mountainous.

The Norwegian writer Olav Duun was born in the village of Dun, in the central part of the island, where Dun Church is located.  Also, Fosnes Chapel is located on the northeastern coast of the island, at the site of the old church and graveyard.

See also
List of islands of Norway

References

Islands of Trøndelag
Namsos